The Colors of Nature: Culture, Identity, and the Natural World is a 2011 book edited by Alison H. Deming and Lauret E. Savoy. The book is a collection of essays from authors representing diverse backgrounds, including Japanese American, Mestizo, African American, Hawaiian, Arab American, Chicano and Native American. Collectively, the editors use these essays as a backdrop for exploring a deeper issue: the seeming paucity of nature writing by people of color, while writing about their own personal connections to (and disconnections from) nature.

References 

2011 non-fiction books
English-language books
Environmental non-fiction books
Milkweed Editions books
American essay collections